The Mount Vernon Kings was the final moniker of the minor league baseball teams based in Mount Vernon, Illinois, U.S. between 1910 and 1954. Mount Vernon last played as members of the Mississippi–Ohio Valley League from 1949 to 1954, a league that evolved into today's Midwest League. Mount Vernon teams previously played as members of the Southern Illinois League in 1910 and Illinois State League in 1947 and 1948. The Mount Vernon franchise permanently folded after the 1954 season.

The ballpark
The Mount Vernon Kings were noted to have played their minor league home games at Veterans Park. Veterans Park hosted Mississippi-Ohio Valley League All-Star Games in 1949 and 1951. Veterans Park is still in existence as a public park without a ball field. The park is located at 800 South 27th Street, Mount Vernon, Illinois.

No hitter
On September 4, 1951, Stanley Burat threw a no-hitter against the Centralia Cubs, winning 10–0.

Notable alumni
 Roy Lee (1953)
 Chuck Hawley (1951, MGR) Played Professional Basketball and Baseball
 Billy Queen (1947-1948)
 Otto Huber (1947)
 Don Liddle (1947)

References

Baseball teams established in 1949
Defunct minor league baseball teams
Defunct baseball teams in Illinois
Professional baseball teams in Illinois
Illinois State League
Mississippi-Ohio Valley League
Boston Braves minor league affiliates
1947 establishments in Illinois
Baseball teams disestablished in 1954
1954 disestablishments in Illinois